Thunder Creek is a river in the Canadian province of Saskatchewan. The watershed of Thunder Creek is within the semi-arid Palliser's Triangle in south-central Saskatchewan. It begins at small, man-made reservoir near Lake Diefenbaker and flows in a south-easterly direction towards the city of Moose Jaw and the Moose Jaw River. The Moose Jaw River is a major tributary of the Qu'Appelle River For most of its course, Thunder Creek follows a valley called the Thunder Creek meltwater channel that was formed over 10,000 years ago near the end of the last ice age.

During the drought of the 1980s, the river, and the marshes and lakes along its course, almost ran dry. To stabilise water levels, a reservoir was built at the head of the river. The reservoir is supplied by pumping in water from nearby Lake Diefenbaker.

Description 
Thunder Creek begins at the man-made reservoir and flows into the Thunder Creek meltwater channel. Once in the valley, the river meanders its way along the valley floor. Along the way, it is joined by several creeks flowing in from the coulees. The western tributaries of upper Thunder Creek watershed drain a hilly plateau called the Vermilion Hills. There are four small lakes in a chain along the course that are part of two Important Bird Areas, including Paysen (Horfield) Lake, Williams Lake, Kettlehut Lake, and Pelican Lake. As the water level of Pelican Lake–the last lake in the chain of lakes–isn't always high enough to provide an outflow, Sandy Creek, which is about one kilometre downstream from Pelican Lake, becomes the primary water source for the last leg of Thunder Creek.

Communities found along the river's course include Moose Jaw, Boharm, and Caron. Highways 1, 19, 627, and 643 cross Thunder Creek.

Tributaries 
Thunder Creek tributaries include:
Allin Creek
Aquadell Creek
Sandy Creek
Wilson Creek

Important Bird Areas 
There are two Important Bird Areas (IBA) of Canada along the course of Thunder Creek. In 1990, the Riverhurst Management Plan, which was developed by Ducks Unlimited through the North American Waterfowl Management Plan, was initiated to stabilise water levels in the lakes and marshes by pumping in water from Lake Diefenbaker. Stable water levels provide habitat for birds and other wildlife.

Paysen /Kettlehut Lake 
Paysen/Kettlehut Lake IBA SK 057 encompasses Paysen, Williams, and Kettlehut Lakes and the surrounding river valley. It is Crown land that is composed of grasslands, ponds, marshes, and creeks. Birds found in the lakes and protected area include the western grebe, black-necked grebe, Franklin's gull, Forster's tern, marsh wren, sedge wren, common yellowthroat, LeConte's sparrow, and Nelson's sparrow.

Pelican Lake 
Pelican Lake is the largest of the four lakes along the course of Thunder Creek and is recognised as a regional Western Hemisphere Shorebird Reserve Network (WHSRN) site. Ducks Unlimited built three cross-dykes on Pelican Lake in 1964, 1973, and 1989 to help maintain water levels.

Some of the birds commonly found at the IBA include the American avocet, marbled godwit, Wilson's phalarope, grey plover, tundra swan, mallard duck, gadwall duck, western grebe, blue-winged teal, northern pintail, and the American white pelican.

Besant Recreation Site 
Besant Recreation Site is a 300-acre provincial recreation site along the course of Sandy Creek in the RM of Caron No. 162.

Besant Recreation Site is well treed and has about 100 campsites, sandhills, a spring-fed pond, a swimming area, and access to Sandy Creek. The pond is stocked with fish. The park was home to the Sandy Creek Gospel Jamboree.

Fish species 
The most commonly found fish in the Thunder Creek river system is the northern pike. Other species include the common carp, burbot, largemouth bass, yellow perch, and walleye.

See also 
List of rivers of Saskatchewan
Hudson Bay drainage basin
Tourism in Saskatchewan
List of protected areas of Saskatchewan

References 

Rivers of Saskatchewan
Tributaries of Hudson Bay
Important Bird Areas of Saskatchewan
Enfield No. 194, Saskatchewan
Caron No. 162, Saskatchewan
Tributaries of the Assiniboine River